Austroargiolestes christine is a species of Australian damselfly in the family Megapodagrionidae,
commonly known as a milky flatwing. 
It is endemic to mountain areas of northern New South Wales, where it inhabits streams and boggy areas.

Austroargiolestes christine is a medium-sized to large, black and pale yellow damselfly, with pruinescence on adult bodies .
Like other members of the family Megapodagrionidae, it rests with its wings outspread.

Austroargiolestes christine appears similar to Austroargiolestes isabellae, which is found in the Sydney district.

Gallery

See also
 List of Odonata species of Australia

References 

Megapodagrionidae
Odonata of Australia
Insects of Australia
Endemic fauna of Australia
Taxa named by Günther Theischinger
Taxa named by A.F. (Tony) O'Farrell
Insects described in 1986
Damselflies